Rhins may refer to:

 Rhins of Galloway, peninsula in Dumfries and Galloway, Scotland
 Jules Léon Dutreuil de Rhins (1846 –1894), French geographer and explorer

See also
Rinns